Tekedüzü is a village in Bozyazı district of Mersin Province, Turkey. It is situated to the northeast of Bozyazı. The population of the village was only 37 as of 2012.

References

Villages in Bozyazı District